CJ Affiliate (formerly Commission Junction) is an online advertising company owned by Publicis Groupe operating in the affiliate marketing industry, which operates worldwide. The corporate headquarters is in Santa Barbara, California, and there are offices in Atlanta, GA, Chicago, IL, New York, NY  San Francisco, CA Westlake Village, CA and Westborough, MA in the US, and in the UK, Germany, France, Spain, Sweden, India, and South Africa.

beFree, Inc. / Value-click, Inc. 

Former Commission Junction competitor beFree, Inc. was acquired by Value-click, Inc. in 2002, before Commission Junction. beFree was gradually phased out in favor of Commission Junction. On February 3, 2014 Value-click, Inc. announced it has changed its name to Conversant, Inc., bringing former Value-click, Inc. companies Commission Junction, Dotomi, Greystripe, Mediaplex, and Value-click Media under one name. Conversant was bought by Alliance Data in 2014. Commission Junction continues to be known as CJ Affiliate.

See also 

Affiliate marketing
Affiliate programs directories
Affiliate networks

References

External links
 CJ Affiliate (formerly Commission Junction)
 Commission Junction UK

Marketing companies established in 1998
Online advertising services and affiliate networks
Companies based in Santa Barbara County, California
Affiliate marketing
1998 establishments in California